The 1963 NCAA University Division Track and Field Championships were contested June 13−15 at the 41st annual NCAA-sanctioned track meet to determine the individual and team national champions of men's collegiate track and field events in the United States. This was the first championship help explicitly for teams in the NCAA's University Division (the precursor to present-day Division I); all other programs competed at the newly established NCAA College Division Track and Field Championships.

This year's meet was hosted by the University of New Mexico at University Stadium in Albuquerque.

USC won the team national championship, the Trojans' twenty-second title in program history.

Team Result 
 Note: Top 10 only
 (H) = Hosts

References

NCAA Men's Outdoor Track and Field Championship
NCAA University Division Track and Field Championships
NCAA
NCAA University Division Track and Field Championships